Yvanna Cancela (born 1987) is an American politician who served as a member of the Nevada Senate for the 10th district from 2017 to 2021. She joined the Biden administration on January 20, 2021.

Early life and education 
Cancela was born to Cuban immigrants in Phoenix, Arizona, and raised in Miami, Florida. She graduated from Northwestern University with a Bachelor of Arts degree in communications in 2010. While she served in the Nevada Senate, she earned her Juris Doctor from the William S. Boyd School of Law.

Career

Nevada politics 
During the summer of 2009, she interned in Harry Reid's United States Senate office. She then moved to Nevada to work on Reid's 2010 reelection campaign.

Cancela served as the political director for the Culinary Workers Union and as executive director of the Immigrant Workers Citizenship Project. In 2017, Cancela was chosen to succeed Ruben Kihuen, who was elected to the United States House of Representatives, in the Nevada Senate. She took office on February 6, 2017. She became the first Latina to serve in the Nevada Senate.

Cancela was selected as one of seventeen speakers to jointly deliver the keynote address at the 2020 Democratic National Convention. She was also chosen to serve as one of the convention's parliamentarians.

Biden administration 
On January 12, 2021, Cancela announced her resignation in order to join the incoming administration of Joe Biden and Kamala Harris in the United States Department of Health and Human Services as the deputy director of intergovernmental affairs. Since her position does not require a confirmation vote from the United States Senate, she was sworn in on January 20, 2021, and immediately assumed her post.

Sisolak administration 
On August 9, 2021, it was announced that Cancela would leave her position in the Department of Health and Human Services to serve as chief of staff for Governor Steve Sisolak. She assumed office on September 6, 2021.

References

External links

1987 births
21st-century American women politicians
American politicians of Cuban descent
Chiefs of staff to United States state governors
Hispanic and Latino American state legislators in Nevada
Hispanic and Latino American women in politics
Living people
Democratic Party Nevada state senators
Northwestern University alumni
Politicians from Las Vegas
Politicians from Miami
Politicians from Phoenix, Arizona
2020 United States presidential electors
21st-century American politicians
William S. Boyd School of Law alumni
Biden administration personnel
United States Department of Health and Human Services officials